Uncial 0254 (in the Gregory-Aland numbering), is a Greek uncial manuscript of the New Testament. Palaeographically it has been assigned to the 5th century.

Description 

The codex contains a small part of the Epistle to the Galatians 5:13-17, on two parchment leaves (18 cm by 12 cm). It is written in one column per page, 20 lines per page, in uncial letters. 

It is a palimpsest, the upper text is written in Arabic.

Currently it is dated by the INTF to the 5th century.

Location 

Formerly the codex was held at the Qubbat al-Khazna in Damascus. The present location of the codex is unknown. Currently the manuscript is not accessible.

Text 
The Greek text of this codex is a representative of the Alexandrian text-type. Aland placed it in Category I.

See also 

 List of New Testament uncials
 Textual criticism

References

Further reading 

 Kurt Treu, "Ein Weiteres Unzialpalimpsest des Galaterbriefes aus Damaskus" Studia Evangelica 5, T & U 103, (Berlin, 1968), pp. 219-221. 
 G. H. R. Horseley, "New Documents Illustrating Early Christianity" 2 (Macquarie University, 1982), pp. 125-140. 

Greek New Testament uncials
5th-century biblical manuscripts
Palimpsests